Work Song: Live at Sweet Basil is a live album by Nat Adderley's Quintet recorded at the Sweet Basil Jazz Club in 1990 and original released on the Sweet Basil label.

Reception

The Penguin Guide to Jazz states the set "'has some of the energy of its illustrous namesake, though the title track has its rough spots ... A thoroughly satisfying disc ".

Track listing 
 "Work Song" (Nat Adderley) – 10:42
 "High Fly" (Randy Weston) – 13:05
 "In a Sentimental Mood" (Duke Ellington) – 10:51
 "Jive Samba" (Adderley) – 10:59

Personnel 
Nat Adderley – cornet
Sonny Fortune, Vincent Herring – alto saxophone
Rob Bargad – piano
Walter Booker – bass
Jimmy Cobb – drums

References 

1993 live albums
Nat Adderley live albums